Chimes of Freedom is a live EP by American singer-songwriter Bruce Springsteen. It was released in 1988 to support the multi-artist Human Rights Now! Tour in benefit of Amnesty International. This tour was announced near the end of a first-set radio broadcast during Springsteen's July 3, 1988, show in Stockholm, Sweden, after which Bob Dylan's "Chimes of Freedom" was performed. The performance of "Chimes of Freedom" on this EP peaked at number 16 on the Mainstream Rock charts in mid-late 1988.

Background 
The other tracks were also recorded on earlier American stops of Springsteen and the E Street Band's 1988 Tunnel of Love Express Tour, which also featured the Miami Horns. Most notable is the slowed-down acoustic rendition of "Born to Run." "Be True" was originally released as a studio recording on a vinyl single as the B-side to "Fade Away" in 1980, and featured prominently as the second or third song of the shows.

Release 
The EP is certified gold in Canada in 1988, for over 50,000 copies sold.

In the original vinyl and cassette release, all tracks were at full length, while on compact disc (CD) "Chimes of Freedom" and "Tougher Than The Rest" were edited for length. The format used was the three-inch CD single, which limited the length that could be used. When re-released in the full size five-inch CD, the edited versions remained. Some later CD re-issues have restored it to full length, as well as the version released to iTunes

Track listing

Personnel 
 Bruce Springsteen – lead vocals, guitar, harmonica
 Roy Bittan – synthesizer, piano
 Clarence Clemons – saxophone, percussion
 Danny Federici – organ
 Nils Lofgren – guitar
 Patti Scialfa – vocals, guitar
 Garry Tallent – bass guitar
 Max Weinberg – drums
 Mario Cruz – saxophone
 Eddie Manion – saxophone
 Mark Pender – trumpet
 Richie "La Bamba" Rosenberg – trombone
 Mike Spengler – trumpet

References 

1988 EPs
Live EPs
1988 live albums
Bruce Springsteen EPs
Bruce Springsteen live albums